Bhadohi is a constituency of the Uttar Pradesh Legislative Assembly covering the city of Bhadohi in the Bhadohi district of Uttar Pradesh, India.

Bhadohi is one of five assembly constituencies in the Bhadohi Lok Sabha constituency. Since 2008, this assembly constituency is numbered 392 amongst 403 constituencies.

Election results

2022

2017

References

External links
 

Assembly constituencies of Uttar Pradesh
Bhadohi